Henry Harriman may refer to:

Henry Harriman (Mormon) (1804–1891), one of the First Seven Presidents of the Seventy of The Church of Jesus Christ of Latter-day Saints
Henry I. Harriman (1873–1950), president of the U.S. Chamber of Commerce